Shlomo Moussaieff is the name of:
 Shlomo Moussaieff (rabbi) (1852–1922), one of the founders of the Bukharan Quarter in Jerusalem
 Shlomo Moussaieff (businessman) (1925–2015), Israeli-born businessman